The maxillary first premolar is one of two teeth located in the upper jaw, laterally (away from the midline of the face) from both the maxillary canines of the mouth but mesial (toward the midline of the face) from both maxillary second premolars.  The function of this premolar is similar to that of canines in regard to tearing being the principal action during mastication, commonly known as chewing.  There are two cusps on maxillary first premolars, and the buccal (closest to the cheek) cusp is sharp enough to resemble the prehensile teeth found in carnivorous animals.  There are no deciduous maxillary premolars.  Around 10-11 years of age, the primary molars are shed and the permanent premolars erupt in their place. It takes about 3 years for the adult premolar and its root to fully calcify.
Due to its long buccal root with narrow root canal and short palatal root with wide root canal, the upper 1st premolar is very prone to fracture during exodontia, hence, it is sometimes referred to some dentists as the "King of Fracture".
In the universal system of notation, the permanent maxillary premolars are designated by a number.  The right permanent maxillary first premolar is known as "5", and the left one is known as "12".  In the Palmer notation, a number is used in conjunction with a symbol designating in which quadrant the tooth is found.  For this tooth, the left and right first premolars would have the same number, "4", but the right one would have the symbol, "┘", underneath it, while the left one would have, "└".  The international notation has a different numbering system than the previous two, and the right permanent maxillary first premolar is known as "14", and the left one is known as "24".

References
Ash, Major M. and Stanley J. Nelson,  2003. Wheeler’s Dental Anatomy, Physiology, and Occlusion. 8th edition.

Types of teeth
Human mouth anatomy